Datuk Haji Hasbi bin Habibollah (Jawi: حسبي بن حبيب الله; born 2 January 1963) is a Malaysian politician who has served as the Deputy Minister of Transport for the second term in the Pakatan Harapan (PH) administration under Prime Minister Anwar Ibrahim and Minister Anthony Loke Siew Fook since December 2022 and the Member of Parliament (MP) for Limbang since March 2008. He served the first term in the Perikatan Nasional (PN) administration under former Prime Minister Muhyiddin Yassin and former Minister Wee Ka Siong from March 2020 to the collapse of the PN administration in August 2021 and the Deputy Minister of Rural Development II in the Barisan Nasional (BN) administration under former Prime Minister Ismail Sabri Yaakob and former Minister Mahdzir Khalid from August 2021 to the collapse of BN administration in November 2022. He is member of the Parti Pesaka Bumiputera Bersatu (PBB), a component party of the Gabungan Parti Sarawak (GPS) coalition which is aligned with the PN coalition and a former component party of the Barisan Nasional (BN) coalition. 

Hasbi was previously an engineer before being elected to the Parliament by a narrow margin in the 2008 general election for the newly created seat of Limbang. He managed to retain the seat in the 2013 and 2018 general elections.

Election results

Honours
  :
 Companion of the Order of Loyalty to the Crown of Malaysia (JSM) (2016)
  :
 Commander of the Order of the Territorial Crown (PMW) – Datuk (2021)
 :
 Companion of the Most Exalted Order of the Star of Sarawak (JBS)

References

1963 births
Living people
Malaysian people of Malay descent 
People from Sarawak
Malaysian Muslims
Malaysian people of Bruneian descent 
Parti Pesaka Bumiputera Bersatu politicians
Members of the Dewan Rakyat
Companions of the Order of Loyalty to the Crown of Malaysia